Chalacot or Chelekot is a village in the Tigray Region of Ethiopia. Located in the Enderta woreda (district) of the Debub Misraqawi (Southeastern) Zone, 10 kilometers north of Antalo and 17 kilometers south of Mek'ele, the village has an approximate elevation of 2100 meters above sea level. The Central Statistical Agency has not published an estimate for this village's 2005 population.

Geology and soils 
The following geological formations are present in this locality:
 Amba Aradam Formation
 Agula Shale
 Mekelle Dolerite
 Antalo Limestone
 Quaternary alluvium and freshwater tufa
The main geomorphic units, with corresponding soil types are:
 Gently rolling Antalo Limestone plateau, holding cliffs and valley bottoms on limestone
 Associated soil types
 shallow stony soils with a dark surface horizon overlying calcaric material (Calcaric Leptosol)
 moderately deep dark stony clays with good natural fertility (Vertic Cambisol)
 deep, dark cracking clays on calcaric material (Calcaric Vertisol, Calcic Vertisol)
 Inclusions
 Rock outcrops and very shallow soils (Lithic Leptosol)
 Shallow very stony loamy soil on limestone (Skeletic Calcaric Cambisol)
 Deep dark cracking clays with very good natural fertility, waterlogged during the wet season (Chromic Vertisol, Pellic Vertisol)
 Brown to dark sands and silt loams on alluvium (Vertic Fluvisol, Eutric Fluvisol, Haplic Fluvisol)

History 
Chalacot is mentioned in a charter written in 1794, when Emperor Tekle Giyorgis made a grant to Meqdese Selassie Church in the village; the document mentions seven properties. Ras Wolde Selassie made Chalacot his capital, and received Henry Salt there in 1810. The Ras built a palace in the village, as well as houses for his wives and the church Chelekot Selassie, which Philips Briggs described as an "architecturally impressive example of the circular tikul styles of paintings" and "covered in beautiful 19th-century paintings". When Wolde Selassie died in Chalacot (1816), his nephew Walda Rufa'el sacked it.

The town had recovered its former prosperity by the 1840s when Ferret and Galiner visited it; they described it as "one of the principal towns" of Ethiopia, with a population of 3,000 living in well-constructed houses and well-kept gardens. However, a little more than a generation later Chalacot had declined; Guglielmo Massaia found only 200 houses with about 1,000 inhabitants and in the 1880s Augustus B. Wylde reported he counted only 80 houses there. The town suffered further losses during the First Italo–Ethiopian War according to Richard Pankhurst, who included Chalacot in a list of northern Ethiopian towns affected by the "disturbed conditions of the times."

Notable inhabitant

Chelekot is the birthplace of Ras Araya Dimtsu of Enderta chief crown counciler to Emperor Yohannes IV of Ethiopia 1867-1889. Ras Araya was also an influential governor of Tigray and Akale Guzay. He died at the battle of Metema while fighting against the mahdists of Sudan along with Emperor Yohaness in March 1889. He is the maternal uncle of Emperor Yohannes. Emperor Yohannes's mother, Amate Silas Dimtsu is also from Chelekot where she was born from her father Dejazmach Dimtsu Debbab of Enderta, a some time hereditary chief of Enderta in the 1820s and 1830s.  Chelekot is also the burial place of Empress Tiruwork Wube the granddaughter of Ras Wolde Selassie, and the widow of Emperor Tewodros II.  Emperor Menelik II paid a visit to the churches of Chelekot on his way to the Battle of Adwa and gave his robes of state to the Church of the Holy Trinity (Mekdese Selassie) as thanks for his victory over the Italians where they are still displayed.

Notes 

Populated places in the Tigray Region